This is a list of airlines currently operating in Cameroon:

See also 
List of defunct airlines of Cameroon
List of airlines
List of defunct airlines of Africa

References

 
Airlines
Cameroon
Airlines
Cameroon